Sir Stanley James Allen Hill  (21 December 1926 – 16 February 1999) was a British Conservative Party politician.

Hill was educated at Regent's Park School, Southampton, North Wales Naval Training College, and Southampton University. He was twice Member of Parliament (MP) for the marginal Southampton Test seat, from 1970 to October 1974, and again from 1979 until 1997.  At the end of both these terms he lost the seat to the Labour candidate, on the latter occasion to Alan Whitehead. Hill also served as a Member of the European Parliament (MEP) from 1973 to 1975. He was knighted in 1996 while serving as MP under John Major.

Personal life
He was married to his wife Susan for forty years and they had five children, his wife moved to Kings Somborne after her husband's death in 1999. Lady Susan died in 2008, aged 83.

References

Sources
"Times Guide to the House of Commons", Times Newspapers Limited, 1997
Whitaker's Almanack, The Stationery Office, 2000.

External links 
 

1926 births
1999 deaths
Conservative Party (UK) MPs for English constituencies
UK MPs 1970–1974
UK MPs 1974
UK MPs 1979–1983
UK MPs 1983–1987
UK MPs 1987–1992
UK MPs 1992–1997
Knights Bachelor
Conservative Party (UK) MEPs
MEPs for the United Kingdom 1973–1979
Politicians awarded knighthoods